Andronikos Doukas, Latinized as Andronicus Ducas, may refer to:

 Andronikos Doukas (general under Leo VI) (died  910)
 Andronikos Doukas (co-emperor) ( 1057 – after 1081), Byzantine co-emperor from 1068 to 1078
 Andronikos Doukas (cousin of Michael VII) (died 1077), Byzantine general
 Andronikos Doukas Palaiologos ( 1083/5 –  1115/18), Byzantine governor of Thessalonica
 Andronikos Doukas Angelos ( 1122 – died after 1185), Byzantine general in Asia Minor